2C-B-DRAGONFLY (2C-B-DFLY) is a recreational designer drug with psychedelic effects. It can be regarded as the fully aromatic derivative of 2C-B-FLY. 2C-B-DRAGONFLY is stronger than 2C-B or 2C-B-FLY with around 2-3x the potency of 2C-B in animal studies, demonstrating the importance of the fully aromatic benzodifuran ring system for optimum receptor binding at 5-HT2A, but it is still considerably less potent than its alpha-methyl derivative Bromo-DragonFLY.

See also 
 2C-B-aminorex
 2C-B-BUTTERFLY
 2C-B-PP
 2C-E-FLY
 DOB-FLY
 NBOMe-2C-B-FLY
 TFMFly
 Substituted benzofuran

References 

Bromoarenes
Designer drugs
Psychedelic phenethylamines
Serotonin receptor agonists
Oxygen heterocycles
Heterocyclic compounds with 3 rings